The 82nd Drive Pedestrian Bridge  is a pedestrian bridge connecting Gladstone and Oregon City in the U.S. state of Oregon. The bridge has been owned and maintained by the Clackamas Water Environment Services since 1998.

History
The bridge was closed temporarily in 2017 for "assessment and inspection". It underwent seismic retrofitting in 2019 and reopened in 2020.

References

Buildings and structures in Oregon City, Oregon
Gladstone, Oregon
Pedestrian bridges in Oregon